Andre Neethling (born 3 July 1979) is a Zimbabwean cricketer. He played seven first-class matches between 2000 and 2002.

References

External links
 

1979 births
Living people
Zimbabwean cricketers
CFX Academy cricketers
Mashonaland A cricketers
Sportspeople from Harare